Carla Swart  (26 November 1987 – 19 January 2011) was a South African cyclist who won nineteen individual and team cycling titles. She was a professional cyclist, riding for HTC–Highroad Women in 2011.

Swart moved to the United States in 2004 as a teenager.  She attended Lees-McRae College, where she was awarded scholarships in running and cycling.

Career

Carla Swart became the first cyclist to win all four U.S. collegiate titles in one season (2008).  She placed 10th in the women's road race in the 2010 UCI Road World Championships, and had placed eighth at the Commonwealth Games in October of that year.  She signed with the HTC-Highroad cycling team shortly before her death.  Her career spanned 21 national titles in four different biking disciplines: cyclo-cross, mountain bike, road, and track.

Death
Swart died whilst training in South Africa after being hit by a truck. It was claimed that she had looked over her left shoulder, as if she were in the United States, instead of her right, as would normally be the case in South Africa where vehicles drive on the left-hand side of the road.  teammate Ellen van Dijk dedicated her stage win and general classification victory at the 2011 Ladies Tour of Qatar to Swart. The prize money Van Dijk earned in Qatar was sent to her family. Lees-McRae College has a scholarship named in her honor.

Major results
Source:
2009
 1st Stage 4 Tour of the Gila
 8th Overall Tour de PEI
2010
 National Road Championships
3rd Time trial
4th Road Race
 8th Ronde van Drenthe
 8th Liberty Classic
 8th Commonwealth Games Road race
 10th Overall Trophée d'Or Féminin
 10th World Championship Road race

See also
2011 HTC-Highroad Women season

References

External links
 

2011 deaths
Afrikaner people
South African female cyclists
South African emigrants to the United States
South African people of Dutch descent
Lees–McRae College alumni
Road incident deaths in South Africa
Cycling road incident deaths
1987 births
Cyclists at the 2010 Commonwealth Games
Commonwealth Games competitors for South Africa